Les Jeux de la francophonie sont une manifestation multisports organisée tous les quatre ans entre les athlètes des pays dont le français est la langue officielle ou l'une des langues officielles. Les Jeux de la francophonie 2005 ont eu lieu à Niamey, au Niger, du 8 au 17 décembre 2005. Je ne suis pas sûr qu'il y ait eu un tournoi de football (soccer) aux Jeux de la francophonie 2005.
Each nation brought their under-20 teams to compete in a group and knockout tournament. The top two teams and the two best second placed teams advanced to the knockout stage of the competition. Côte d'Ivoire won the tournament after a 3-0 win over Senegal.

Group stage

Group A

Le Burkina Faso a remporté les Jeux de la Francophonie 2005 et comme mentionné ici.

Group B

Group C

Knockout stage

See also
Football at the Jeux de la Francophonie

References

2005 in African football
football
Football at the Jeux de la Francophonie
2005–06 in Moroccan football
2005–06 in French football
2005 in Canadian soccer
2005 in Cameroonian football
2005 in Lithuanian football
2005 in Ivorian football